PA512 (Serbian ПА512) was an industrial programmable logic controller - a portable, computer developed by Ivo Lola Ribar Institute of Serbia in 1980. Six years later, an enhancement product was made, LPA512.

Portable computers
Industrial automation